Yiannis Avranas (born ca. 1940) is a Greek former sea captain who commanded the cruise ship Oceanos when she sank off the Wild Coast of the Transkei, South Africa, on Sunday 4 August 1991. In 1994, his English wife Davina published a book about the sinking, titled The Oceanos Tragedy.

Background
At the time of the accident, Yiannis Avranas had been an officer for twenty years and a seaman for thirty. He was married to British national Davina Avrana.

Oceanos sinking

On 3 August 1991, the Oceanos set out from East London, South Africa and headed to Durban. She headed into  winds and  swells. The storm worsened, and at approximately 21:30 UTC+2, while off the Wild Coast of the Transkei, a muffled explosion was heard. The Oceanos lost power following a leak in the engine room's sea chest. The chief engineer reported to Captain Avranas that water was entering the hull and flooding the generator room. The generators were shut down because the rising water would have short circuited them. The ship was left adrift.

Realising the fate of the ship, the crew reportedly fled in panic, neglecting the standard procedure of closing the lower deck portholes. No alarm was raised. Passengers remained ignorant of the events taking place until they witnessed the first signs of flooding in the lower decks. At this stage, eyewitness accounts reveal that many of the crew, including Captain Avranas, were already packed and ready to depart. Finding the ship's bridge abandoned, Moss Hills, an on-board entertainer, used the radio phone to broadcast a mayday until another ship answered.

Hills organized the orderly evacuation of passengers by the helicopters, later reporting that Avranas was among the first to leave at this point. He and fellow entertainer Julian Butler directed the efforts of the entertainment staff - including Robin Boltman - to assist them. According to Boltman, "later in the morning, Captain Avarnasi [sic] even contacted me from shore to ask how things were going." They were among the last to be rescued.

Position of Avranas
Avranas claimed that he left the ship first in order to arrange for a rescue effort, and then supervised it from a helicopter. According to the International Herald Tribune, "Avranas said he had known when he left the ship that there were 170 passengers and crew still aboard [but this was] the only way [to] ensure the safety of all those aboard", furthermore "after checking the situation from the shore, he said, he flew back to the ship on a helicopter, intending to go back on board. But the weather was so bad that the helicopter crew advised against boarding". Avranas was quoted in the New York Times as saying, "When I give the order abandon ship, it doesn't matter what time I leave. Abandonment is for everybody, if some people want to stay, they can stay."

Position of Epirotiki Lines
Captain Alevizos Klaudatos, head of Epirotiki Line, was quoted in The Star as saying: "Of course the crew members assigned to the boats have to enter first in order to assist the embarkation of the passengers", "as regards the captain abandoning the vessel, this is untrue and he has maintained his position throughout in assisting the rescue in the most effective way".

Legal proceedings
A Greek board of inquiry found Avranas and four officers negligent in their handling of the disaster. He was never incarcerated and Epirotiki gave him command of a ferry until his retirement.

Treatment in media
Prior to the events of January 1991, Avranas had apparently given no interview to the media. After the sinking, Avranas attracted extensive media coverage, often being vilified and used as an example of poor professional behaviour while in command. Avranas's emergency management was again widely cited after the Costa Concordia disaster in 2012.

See also
The captain goes down with the ship

References

External links
Career Overboard?, New York Times, 11 August 1991
Barry James, A Captain's Tale: 'The Rescue Was Perfect - Everybody Is Safe', International Herald Tribune, 8 August 1991

1940s births
Greek sailors
Living people